Awards and decorations of the Texas government are bestowed by various agencies of the Texas government to citizens, employees, or service members for acts of accomplishment, meritorious service, eminence in a field, or a specific heroic act.

In order of precedence, some civil awards may be authorized for wear on Texas military uniforms after awards and decorations of the Texas Military Forces.

The following is a list of awards currently issued by the Texas government:

Office of the Governor of Texas 

 Yellow Rose of Texas Award
Texas Women's Hall of Fame

Committee on People with Disabilities 

 Lex Frieden Employment Awards:
 Martha Arbuckle Award
 The Governor's Trophy
 Barbara Jordan Media Award

Governor's Volunteer Awards 

 Governor's Lone Star Achievement Award
 First Lady's Rising Star Award
 Partners in Education Award
 Service to Veterans Award
 Higher Education Community Impact Award – University  
 Higher Education Community Impact Award – Community College
 Corporate Community Impact Award
 Community Leadership Award
 National Service "Make a Difference" Award

Public Safety Office 

 Star of Texas Awards:
Peace Officers' Star Of Texas Award
Firefighters' Star Of Texas Award
Emergency Medical First Responders' Star Of Texas Award
Citizens' Star Of Texas Award
 Texas Best Awards (Crime Stopper organizations)

Source:

Texas Department of Public Safety 

 Medal of Valor
 Adolph Thomas Distinguished Service Award
 Lifesaving Award
 Director's Award
Texas Ranger Hall of Fame

Source:

Texas Legislature 

 Texas Legislative Medal of Honor
 Digital Government Best of Texas Award

Source:

Texas Military Department 

Awards and decorations of the Texas Military
Hall of Honor

Source:

See also 

 Monuments and memorials in Texas
 List of Texas Revolution monuments and memorials
 Awards and decorations of the United States government

References 

Orders, decorations, and medals of Texas
Awards and decorations of the Texas Military Forces